Murder Investigation Team is a British police procedural drama/cop thriller series produced by the ITV network as a spin-off from the long-running series, The Bill. The series recounts the activities of the Metropolitan Police's Murder Investigation Team, who are led by D.I. Vivien Friend (Samantha Spiro) and D.S. Rosie MacManus (Lindsey Coulson). The series, also starring Diane Parish, Steven Pacey (best known for playing Del Tarrant in the 1970s sci-fi drama Blake’s 7) and Michael McKell, produced 12 episodes between 3 May 2003 and 1 August 2005. In September 2005, The Sun reported that ITV would not be commissioning a third series.

Background
Like The Bill, Murder Investigation Team was filmed in the London Boroughs of Sutton, Merton and Greenwich. Locations included the former Woolwich campus of the University of Greenwich. The first series debuted on 3 May 2003, and ran for eight episodes. This series was filmed with the working title Think Murder, and was produced by Tom Cotter. The first episode featured the team investigating the death of one of The Bills most popular characters, Sgt. Matthew Boyden, who was killed in a drive-by shooting. Several members of The Bills cast also appeared in the episode.

The first series also featured guest appearances from such actors as Gary Kemp, Paul Bown and Bradley Walsh. After a two-year hiatus, a second series of four episodes debuted on 11 July 2005. All four episodes had previously been broadcast in February 2005 in Australia. This series features the re-appearance of DC Eva Sharpe, who joined the team, transferring from the CID office at Sun Hill. Each episode in series two was extended by half an hour and was produced by ITV's head of drama, Johnathan Young.

Cast and characters

Main cast and characters
 Lindsey Coulson as Sergeant Rosie MacManus (series 1–2), an M.I.T. detective. MacManus has two children, and must balance work and family life. It is for this reason that she remained a D.C. for much of her career. Four months prior to the start of series 2, she is promoted to D.S. at the behest of newly appointed D.C.I. Wishart, who wants to rid M.I.T. of its "old boy's network" mentality. In series 1, she is partnered with D.I. Friend, while in series 2 she is assigned by Hands to oversee the work of Eva Sharpe. 
 Samantha Spiro as Inspector Vivien "Viv" Friend (series 1), a fast tracked, university-educated D.I. and the senior investigating officer of the Metropolitan Police's Murder Investigation Team. In series 1, she is partnered with D.C. MacManus. Friend departs M.I.T. for promotion six months prior to the start of series 2, and is replaced as D.I. by her Sergeant, Trevor Hands. She is described as detached and methodical. 
 Diane Parish as Constable Eva Sharpe (series 2), a D.C. recruited by D.C.I. Wishart from Sun Hill. Eva is described as being sharp by nature, as well as by name, and during her time at borough policing she had earned herself a reputation as a lone wolf whose attitude "cuts both ways". Eva initially has an adversarial relationship with Hands, because of his relative inexperience as SIO. She is partnered with MacManus. Prior to appearing in series 2 of M.I.T., Parish played Sharpe on sister series The Bill. 
 Michael McKell as Inspector Trevor Hands (series 1–2), initially a Detective Sergeant assigned to Friend's M.I.T. team. Trevor is shown to be loyal to the old way of policing, and resentful of both female leadership and fast-track schemes. Following Friend's departure, he is promoted to D.I., a role he has held for six months by the start of series 2.

Supporting cast and characters
 Meera Syal as D.C.I. Anita Wishart, the Chief Inspector assigned to oversee the Murder Investigation Team during series 2.
 Richard Hope as D.S. Barry Purvis, an office-based detective who coordinates investigations and liaises between police stations.
 Andrew Somerville as D.C. Patrick Lincoln, a junior D.C. assigned to Friend's team in series 1.
 Joe Shaw as D.C. Scott Grainger, a junior D.C. assigned to Friend's team in series 1. His death at the end of series 1 leads to Friend's departure between series. 
 Steven Pacey as D.C.I. Malcolm Savage, the Chief Inspector assigned to oversee the Murder Investigation Team during series 1.
 Hugh Sachs as Dr Charles Renfield, a Scenes of Crime Officer.
 Richard Huw as Dr John Cornell, a Scenes of Crime Officer.
 Vincenzo Pellegrino as Dr Fergus Gallagher, a Scenes of Crime Officer.
 Howard Ward as D.S. Jim Dawes, the crime scene lead on Friend's team during series 1.
 Abhin Galeya as D.C. Simon Tait, a junior D.C. assigned to Hands' team in series 2.
 Will Mellor as D.C. Jed Griffiths, a junior D.C. assigned to Hands' team in series 2.

Series Overview

Episodes

Series 1 (2003)

Series 2 (2005)

DVD releases
From 2011 to 2012, Acorn Media Home Entertainment (under license from talkbackTHAMES and FremantleMedia Enterprises) released the entire 12-episode collection/all 2 seasons of this British modern cult cop thriller series in Region 1 DVD, starting with the first season on March 1, 2011, and the second and final season on March 27, 2012.

References

External links
 

2003 British television series debuts
2005 British television series endings
2000s British drama television series
2000s British crime television series
ITV television dramas
Television series by Fremantle (company)
Television shows produced by Thames Television
Television shows set in London
British television spin-offs
English-language television shows
Murder investigation